The women's pentathlon was part of the Athletics at the 1964 Summer Olympics program in Tokyo.  It was held on 16 October and 17 October 1964, with the first three events on 16 October and the last two on 17 October.  20 athletes from 15 nations entered. The 1964 Summer Olympics were the first appearance of the women's pentathlon.

The events of the pentathlon, in order, were:
 80 metre hurdles
 Shot put
 High jump
 Long jump
 200 metres

Results

First day

80 metre hurdles

Shot put

Press's shot put, more than 2.5 metres further than the nearest competitor's, combined with her hurdles victory to give her a solid lead after two events.

High jump

First day rankings
 Irina Press, 3245 points
 Galina Bystrova, 3055 points
 Mary Elizabeth Peters, 3004 points
 Mary Rand, 2917 points
 Draga Stamejcic, 2845 points
 Pat Winslow, 2790 points
 Maria Siziakova, 2786 points
 Denise Guenard, 2779 points
 Dianne Gerace, 2740 points
 Helen Frith, 2738 points
 Ingrid Becker, 2722 points
 Helga Hoffmann, 2718 points
 Nina Hansen, 2711 points
 Ulla Flegel, 2670 points
 Jennifer Wingerson, 2668 points
 Oddrun Hokland, 2583 points
 Amelia Hinten, 2541 points
 Chi Cheng, 2445 points
 Takahashi Miyuki, 2291 points
 Lee Hak Ja, 2196 points

Second day

Long jump
Rand won her second straight event, climbing back up to third place overall after her fall to seventh following the shot put.  Press, never having been outside the top four in any event, increased her lead to over 200 points above fellow Soviet Bystrova.

200 metres
Rand won her third straight event to pass Bystrova and take the silver medal.  Press, who had won the first two events, had her lowest finish of the pentathlon in sixth place, still winning the gold medal by over 200 points and breaking her own world record (5137 points, set in 1961) by more than 100 points.

Final standings

References

Athletics at the 1964 Summer Olympics
1964
1964 in women's athletics
Women's events at the 1964 Summer Olympics